Gwavas is a residential council estate on the southern outskirts of the town of Newlyn in west Cornwall, England, United Kingdom. It is situated immediately west of Gwavas Road and takes its name from nearby Gwavas Farm.

History and geography
The name Gwavas derives from the Cornish "gwaf" meaning winter, and "bos" meaning abode. Its derivation is from the Cornish "gwavos" meaning "winter farm". There are also places of the same name in the parishes of Grade-Ruan and Sithney.

The estate was built by Penzance Borough Council in 1937 following limited slum clearance in the harbour area of Newlyn. The slum clearance programme was intended to be much larger but many houses were saved following the famous Rosebud Campaign.

Situated on hilly ground, Gwavas contributes to much of the area's high standing on the UK government's index of deprivation . Most of the housing stock is now in the ownership of Penwith Housing Association following the sale of Penwith council housing stock in 1994.

Gwavas Lake
Nearby is the Gwavas Lake which is an area of relatively calm water that is situated outside the current harbour area of Newlyn.

References

Newlyn
Housing estates in England